The Joessel-class submarines were a class of two diesel-electric submarines built for the French Navy laid down before the start of World War I and completed after. They were built in the Arsenal de Cherbourg from 1913 to 1920, before entering the French Marine Nationale in 1920 and serving until 1936.

Design
The Joessel class was ordered as part of the French fleet's 1914 program. During construction, though, the idea was abandoned and the ships were instead equipped with diesel engines.

Her complement was 47 men.

The ships were armed with eight 450 mm torpedo tubes (four in the bow, two stern and two external trainable mounts), with a total of 10 torpedoes and two  guns.

Ships 
Two Joessel-class submarines were built in the Arsenal de Cherbourg, France. The ships were laid down in November 1913, launched between 1917 and 1919, and completed in 1920. Joessel received the pennant number Q 109, and Fulton, Q 110. It was planned to build six additional ships of this type, numbered Q 115 to Q 120, but the order was canceled in the course of World War I.

Service

After completion, the ships were refitted: they received a new higher cylindrical conning tower, bridge and two periscopes of 7.5 m (at the conning tower) and 9.5 m (in the central operations room).

The ships served in the Atlantic until the early 1930s and were transferred to Indochina. They were stricken in May 1936.

Notes

Citations

References 

World War I submarines of France
 
Ship classes of the French Navy